Aneuxanthis locupletana is a species of moth of the family Tortricidae. It is found in Portugal, Spain, France, Italy and on Corsica, Sardinia and Sicily.

The wingspan is 20–22 mm. Adults are on wing from June to July.

References

Moths described in 1822
Archipini
Moths of Europe
Taxa named by Jacob Hübner